Iran has provided Russia with loitering munitions for use in the latter's invasion of Ukraine, chiefly the Shahed 131 and Shahed 136. Several countries have accused Iran of violating the United Nations Security Council Resolution 2231.

Background
The United Nations Security Council Resolution 2231 enacted an arms embargo on Iran in 2015. The embargo on conventional Iranian arms ended in October 2020, but the restrictions on Iran regarding missiles and related technologies are in place until October 2023.

Drone deliveries
On 24 February 2022, Russia invaded Ukraine. By 12 April, Russia's attempt to take Kyiv had failed. On that date, The Guardian reported that Iran was smuggling weapons from Iraq to Russia. On 11 July, and again on 17 July, with Russian drone supplies running low, US officials said that Iran was planning to provide Russia with drones. By 17 October, with Russia losing ground to Ukrainian counteroffensives in the East and in the South, Russia had obtained Iranian suicide drones, which it used to attack civilian infrastructure.  By 18 October, Iranian military officials were in Crimea helping Russia to operate Iranian drones.

On 16 October, the Washington Post reported that Iran was planning to supply Russia with both drones and missiles. On 21 November, the Ukrainian defense ministry said that according to reports in the Israeli press, Israel might respond by transferring short-range and medium-range missiles to Ukraine.

On 18 October 2022 the U.S. State Department accused Iran of violating United Nations Security Council Resolution 2231 by selling Shahed 131 and Shahed 136 drones to Russia, agreeing with similar assessments by France and the United Kingdom. Iran's ambassador to the UN responded by writing to the UNSC on 19 October and 24 October stating that this was an erroneous interpretation of paragraph 4 of annex B of the resolution, which clearly states it apples to items that "could contribute to the development of nuclear weapon delivery systems", which these drones could not. Iran denied sending arms for use in the Ukraine war. On 22 October France, Britain and Germany formally called for an investigation by the UN team responsible for UNSCR 2231.

On 1 November, CNN reported that Iran was preparing to send ballistic missiles and other weapons to Russia for use in Ukraine.

On 21 November, CNN reported that an intelligence assessment had concluded that Iran planned to help Russia begin production of Iran-designed drones in Russia. The country making the intelligence assessment was not named.

Ukrainian response 
On 3 November, Ukraine warned Iran to expect an "absolutely ruthless" response if it were to continue supplying weapons to Russia. On 24 November, Ukraine announced that Iranian military advisers had been killed in Crimea. It said that Iranians in occupied territory would continue to be targeted.

Iranian forces in Ukraine 
On 21 October, a White House press release stated that Iranian troops were in Crimea assisting Russia in launching drone attacks against civilians and civilian infrastructure. On November 24 Ukrainian officials said the military had killed ten Iranians and would target any further Iranian military presence in Ukraine. The Institute for the Study of War assessed that these are likely Islamic Revolutionary Guard Corps or IRGC-affiliated personnel, as this formation is the primary operator of Iranian drones.

Impact on Iran–United States relations
Iran's support for Russia, combined with Iranian suppression of the Mahsa Amini protests, and moves towards increased Uranium enrichment, has led to a more confrontational relationship between the United States and Iran. As of 24 November 2022, the United States was not looking to revive any nuclear deal with Iran and had recently imposed additional sanctions on Iran.

On 9 January 2023, US National Security Adviser Jake Sullivan said that Iran's sale of drones to Russia might be “contributing to widespread war crimes” in Ukraine. Sullivan said that the US would look into holding Iran's leadership to account.

References

External links

2022 controversies
2022 in international relations
2022 in Iran
2022 Russian invasion of Ukraine by country
Wars involving Iran
Iran–Ukraine relations
Iran–Russia relations
Military history of Iran
Political history of Iran
Iran–United States relations